Berianwali is a village in the Punjab province of Pakistan.

Populated places in Punjab, Pakistan